Ayyappankave is a village in the Palakkad district, Kerala, India.  The village is about 20 kilometers from Palakkad.

References

Villages in Palakkad district